Events from the year 1812 in Germany.

Incumbents

Kingdoms 
 Kingdom of Prussia
 Monarch – Frederick William III of Prussia (16 November 1797 – 7 June 1840)
 Kingdom of Bavaria
 Maximilian I (1 January 1806 – 13 October 1825)
 Kingdom of Saxony
 Frederick Augustus I (20 December 1806 – 5 May 1827)
 Kingdom of Württemberg
 Frederick I (22 December 1797 – 30 October 1816)

Grand Duchies 
 Grand Duke of Baden
 Charles 10 June 1811 – 8 December 1818
 Grand Duke of Hesse
 Louis I (14 August 1806 – 6 April 1830)
 Grand Duke of Mecklenburg-Schwerin
 Frederick Francis I– (24 April 1785 – 1 February 1837)
 Grand Duke of Mecklenburg-Strelitz
 Charles II (2 June 1794 – 6 November 1816)
 Grand Duke of Oldenburg
 Wilhelm (6 July 1785 –2 July 1823 ) Due to mental illness, Wilhelm was duke in name only, with his cousin Peter, Prince-Bishop of Lübeck, acting as regent throughout his entire reign.
 Peter I (2 July 1823 - 21 May 1829)
 Grand Duke of Saxe-Weimar-Eisenach
 Karl August  (1809–1815)

Principalities 
 Schaumburg-Lippe
 George William (13 February 1787 - 1860)
 Schwarzburg-Rudolstadt
 Friedrich Günther (28 April 1807 - 28 June 1867)
 Schwarzburg-Sondershausen
 Günther Friedrich Karl I (14 October 1794 - 19 August 1835)
 Principality of Lippe
 Leopold II (5 November 1802 - 1 January 1851)
 Principality of Reuss-Greiz
 Heinrich XIII (28 June 1800-29 January 1817)
 Waldeck and Pyrmont
 Friedrich Karl August  (29 August 1763 – 24 September 1812)
 George I (24 September 1812 – 9 September 1813)

Duchies 
 Duke of Anhalt-Dessau
 Leopold III (16 December 1751 – 9 August 1817)
 Duke of Brunswick
 Frederick William (16 October 1806 – 16 June 1815)
 Duke of Saxe-Altenburg
 Duke of Saxe-Hildburghausen (1780–1826)  - Frederick
 Duke of Saxe-Coburg and Gotha
 Ernest I (9 December 1806 – 12 November 1826)
 Duke of Saxe-Meiningen
 Bernhard II (24 December 1803–20 September 1866)
 Duke of Schleswig-Holstein-Sonderburg-Beck
 Frederick Charles Louis (24 February 1775 – 25 March 1816)

Events 
20 February – Weber and his friend, clarinettist Heinrich Baermann, stay overnight in Berlin with the family of Baermann's former teacher Joseph Beer (father of Giacomo Meyerbeer). 
 May – Conference of Dresden
2 July – Ludwig van Beethoven visits his patron Prince Kinsky, seeking an advance on his promised remuneration. 
20 December – The first volume of Grimms' Fairy Tales is published in Germany.
31 December – Giacomo Meyerbeer becomes the toast of Munich after performing at a concert for the benefit of wounded Bavarian soldiers.
 The original Breidenbacher Hof hotel in Düsseldorf, Germany, opens to the public. (It is destroyed by bombing in 1943 and later rebuilt at a different location.)

Births 
6 February – Berthold Damcke, German composer (d. 1875) 
27 April – Friedrich von Flotow, German composer (d. 1883)
14 May – Emilie Mayer, German composer (d. 1883) 
9 June – Johann Gottfried Galle, German astronomer (d. 1910)
24 December – Karl Eduard Zachariae von Lingenthal, German jurist (d. 1894)
28 December – Julius Rietz, German cellist, conductor and composer (d. 1877)

Deaths 

24 March – Johann Jakob Griesbach, German Biblical commentator (born 1745)
29 March – Johann Friedrich Dryander, German-born portrait painter (born 1756)
14 July – Christian Gottlob Heyne, German librarian and classicist (born 1729)*16 June – Franz Pforr, German Nazarene movement painter (born 1788)
10 July – Carl Ludwig Willdenow, German botanist (born 1765)
23 August – Tethart Philipp Christian Haag, German-born Dutch portrait artist (born 1737)
19 September – Mayer Amschel Rothschild, German banker (b. 1744)
21 September – Emanuel Schikaneder, German dramatist, actor and singer (b. 1751)

References 

Years of the 19th century in Germany

 
Germany
Germany